Nacrite Al2Si2O5(OH)4 is a clay mineral that is polymorphous (or polytypic) with kaolinite. It crystallizes in the monoclinic system. X-ray diffraction analysis is required for positive identification.

Nacrite was first described in 1807 for an occurrence in Saxony, Germany. The name is from nacre in reference to the dull luster of the surface of nacrite masses scattering light with slight iridescences resembling those of the mother of pearls secreted by oysters.

References

Clay minerals group
Polymorphism (materials science)
Monoclinic minerals
Minerals in space group 9